Hiroshi Kuwashima ( Kuwashima Hiroshi; 14 August 1932 – 16 December 2021) was a Japanese politician. He served as mayor of Morioka from 1995 to 2003.

References

1932 births
2021 deaths
Japanese politicians
Iwate University alumni
Mayors of places in Japan
People from Morioka, Iwate
People from Iwate Prefecture